Levonne Rowan (born November 2, 1982) is a former defensive back.  He played college football at Wisconsin.

External links
Profile

1982 births
Living people
Sportspeople from Erie, Pennsylvania
American football safeties
Wisconsin Badgers football players
Oakland Raiders players
Players of American football from Pennsylvania
Amsterdam Admirals players